Klokočevac is a suburb of the city of Bjelovar

References 

Populated places in Bjelovar-Bilogora County